Sniz & Fondue is a series of animated shorts originally appearing on the first three seasons of the animation-anthology series KaBlam! on the American cable television network Nickelodeon.

Premise
The series is about the day-to-day lives of two ferret roommates, Sniz and Fondue. Sniz is hyperactive and playfully impulsive, traits that resulted in trouble for himself and his roommate, Fondue. Sniz sports a lime-green Mohawk haircut. Fondue was generally nervous as a result of Sniz's rambunctiousness, which resulted in him being on his guard. Fondue sports a blue chef's hat. They live with two other roommates, Snuppa and Bianca.

Production
Created by Mike R. Brandon (credited as Michael Pearlstein at the time of the cartoon's premiere), Sniz & Fondue was inspired and derived from characters of his short-lived comic series for a small comic book publishing company Northstar called "Puppy Action!". He later received a phone call from Linda Simensky, the head of Nickelodeon's programming at the time, who had found the first issue of "Puppy Action!" and asked him if he'd be interested in creating a pilot for a potential series. So, he produced the 1992 pilot "Psyched for Snuppa" by Stretch Films and Jumbo Pictures, under the self-proclaimed disliked direction of John R. Dilworth, creator of Cartoon Network's Courage the Cowardly Dog. Although the pilot was passed by Nickelodeon in favor of Trash-O-Madness, the pilot of Rocko's Modern Life, the Nickelodeon team liked Sniz and Fondue so much that they spun the characters into a series of segments for KaBlam!. Unfortunately, John R. Dilworth, Jim Jinkins, and David Campbell were only involved in the pilot and had no involvement with the rest of Sniz & Fondue when it became a part of KaBlam! (Jim Jinkins and David Campbell had officially moved their jobs to Disney Enterprises when they purchased Jumbo Pictures). Dilworth was asked by the board to direct the Sniz & Fondue series in New York City, but he declined due to other interests.

Brandon was in charge of writing, storyboarding, character designing, creating the title cards and doing additional voices. The first season oversaw the animation at Israeli animation studio Pitchi Poy Animation Productions, which Brandon despised due to how off-model the characters ended up being. They also mostly used stock music from Associated Production Music. The cue used for the show's title card was "Toys for Boys", composed by Boris Schoska. Eventually for the second and third season, they switched the oversea animation to Funbag Animation Studios in Canada with most of the animation and writing done in New York City, as well as going back to using original music cues with new title cards. Originally, Viacom was considering having the second and third season be animated at Spümcø in California, but Brandon convinced them to have it done closely to his friends and family in New York. One of the show's trademarks is that the characters (mostly Sniz) often sing or quote lyrics from real-life songs such as in the episode, "Stuntbike Sniz", where Sniz said to Fondue the main chorus of the song "You're the Inspiration" as well as the episode "Crustacean Sensations" where Sniz was singing The Bee Gees song “Night Fever” while wandering in the woods.

Unfortunately, the series came to an end as Brandon decided to leave the series out of frustration due to having to do most of the work in the production, as well as Funbag being on the verge of going bankrupt while working on a TV-adaption for Watership Down. He was offered a half hour time spin-off but due to his departure, the offer was given to Stephen Hillenburg for SpongeBob SquarePants. The final episode, "Hosed!", ultimately with Brandon not involved in any way, aired within the season-three KaBlam! episode "It's All In The Wrist".

Characters
 Sniz Bronkowski — Sniz is a crazy little ferret who gets himself into trouble on a daily basis. Luckily, Fondue has ways to bail Sniz and himself out of ordeals. His hairstyle is always a green mohawk, except for one episode in which he went bald due to using too much hair gel. Sniz was voiced by Rick Gomez (credited as "R.H. Gomez") Originally, Sniz was supposed to be voiced by John Walsh, but the Nickelodeon team decided on Gomez instead.
 Squeaky Fondue — Fondue is a frustrated, but intelligent otter who is also Sniz's roommate. He is always seen wearing a blue chef hat. His real name is Squeaky. Fondue was voiced by Oscar Riba. Originally, Brandon wanted to voice Fondue himself like he did in the pilot "Psyched for Snuppa" but the Nickelodeon producers believed that he should not be too close to his creation. He is named after the food fondue.
 Snuppa Doojers — One of Sniz and Fondue's roommates. Like Fondue, he is bald too. Snuppa and his girlfriend Bianca, who share a house with roommates Sniz and Fondue, were later phased out in the third season as the writers believed that Sniz and Fondue seem to write themselves. Snuppa was voiced by Meat Loaf in the pilot episode and by John Andrew Walsh in the shorts.
 Bianca Lo Bianca — One of Sniz and Fondue's roommates. She has a clownish blond hairstyle and is Snuppa's girlfriend. Bianca and Snuppa, who share a house with roommates Sniz and Fondue, were later phased out in the third season as the writers believed that Sniz and Fondue seem to write themselves. Bianca was voiced by Monica Lee Gradischek (credited as Lee Bashforth).

Episodes

Pilot (1992)

Season 1 (1996)
Every season 1 episode was written by Mike R. Brandon and directed by Frank Gresham.

Season 2 (1997)

See also
 List of programs broadcast by Nickelodeon

References

External links
 

KaBlam!
1990s American animated television series
1996 American  television series debuts
1998 American  television series endings
American children's animated comedy television series
Animated television series about mammals
Television shows set in Missouri